Gerónimo del Campo (30 September 1902 – 9 August 1967) was a Spanish footballer. He played in one match for the Spain national football team in 1923.

References

External links
 

1902 births
1967 deaths
Spanish footballers
Spain international footballers
Footballers from the Community of Madrid
Association football forwards
Real Madrid CF players
Olympic footballers of Spain
Footballers at the 1924 Summer Olympics